The Indiana University School of Public Health-Bloomington is an undergraduate and graduate school at Indiana University Bloomington. Until 2012, it was the School of Health, Physical Education, and Recreation (HPER). Now, the School of Public Health on IU's Bloomington campus enrolls 2,790 undergraduate and graduate students, offers 34 different degrees, and has five academic departments. In 2020, the School of Public Health-Bloomington was reaccredited by the Council on Education for Public Health.

History 
The precursor to the School of Public Health-Bloomington, the School of Health, Physical Education, and Recreation, was founded in 1946. In 2012, the school became the School of Public Health-Bloomington. The school earned accreditation from the Council on Education for Public Health in 2015. It has the oldest Master of Public Health program, established in 1969, in the state of Indiana.

A history book, A Legacy Transformed, about the school's origins and transformation into the IU School of Public Health-Bloomington, was published in 2016.

Pamela S. Whitten was elected Indiana University's 19th president and the first woman to serve as president of the university on April 16, 2021. Dr. Whitten was appointed a tenured professor in the School of Public Health-Bloomington.

Academics 
The school offers Bachelor of Science, Master of Science, Master of Public Health, and Ph.D. degrees.

The school is organized into five departments:
 Applied Health Science
 Environmental and Occupational Health
 Epidemiology and Biostatistics
 Kinesiology
 Health & Wellness Design

In the 2021 Best Graduate Schools survey by U.S. News & World Report, the school was ranked the 41st school of public health in the U.S.

Notable people

Faculty 
 David B. Allison, current dean
 Hobie Billingsley, diving coach
 James Counsilman, swimming coach
 Ruth C. Engs, applied health scientist
 Debby Herbenick, sexual health expert
 Bob Knight, basketball coach
 James M. Ridenour, former director of the National Park Service
 Pamela S. Whitten, Indiana University's 19th president
 Jerry Yeagley, soccer coach

Alumni 
 Larry R. Ellis, former commander of the U.S. Army Forces Command
 Dick Enberg, sportscaster
 Mark Hertling, former commanding general of the U.S. Army Europe and the Seventh Army
 Laura Kelly, 48th governor of Kansas
 Robin Milhausen, sexual health expert
 Juwan Morgan, professional basketball player
 Victor Oladipo, professional basketball player
 Frank Pyke, sports scientist
 Nikos Stavropoulos, professional basketball player
 Sage Steele, ESPN television anchor
 George Taliaferro, first African American football player selected in the National Football League draft
 Christian Watford, professional basketball player
 Harrison Wilson Jr., basketball coach

References 

Indiana University
Schools of public health in the United States
Medical and health organizations based in Indiana
International medical and health organizations
Educational institutions established in 2012
2012 establishments in Indiana